La Tribu is a Canadian independent record label founded in 1999 in Quebec.

Noted artists
Dorothée Berryman
Robert Charlebois
Les Cowboys Fringants
Dee
Dumas
Louise Forestier
Fred Fortin/Gros Mené
Jorane
Juste Robert (fr)
Kate & Anna McGarrigle
Jérôme Minière
La Volée d'Castors
WD-40

See also

Music of Quebec
List of Quebec record labels
List of record labels

References

External links
La Tribu Official site

Canadian independent record labels
Quebec record labels
Folk record labels
Companies based in Montreal